The Plesner Fragment is a parchment page from c. 1275. It is one of the four fragments remaining, or early copy of, the original Saxo Gesta Danorum. Size is 15x13cm. It consists of one page with two written sides.

History
Found in 1877 by C. U. A. Plesner in Geheime-archive (Danish National Archives), where it was used as staple-list on Kristianstad fief taxman-number (skattemandtal) list of 1623.
Now owned by the Royal Library of Copenhagen. It has Royal Library signature of Ny kgl. Saml. Fol. 570.

Correspond to page 811–813 in Peter Erasmus Müller Latin version of Gesta Danorum from 1839 or page 459.15 – 460.24 in Jørgen Olrik & H. Ræder's Latin version of Gesta Danorum from 1931.

See also
 Angers Fragment
 Lassen Fragment
 Kall-Rasmussen Fragment

References
 Apoteker Sibbernsens Saxobog, C. A. Reitzels Forlag, Copenhagen, 1927.

Medieval literature
Danish chronicles
13th-century manuscripts
13th-century Latin books